Diarmuid Healy (born 1948) is an Irish former hurling manager who has had All-Ireland success with St Kieran's College, Kilkenny and Offaly.

He has been interviewed on RTÉ to voice his opinions on the state of hurling in Ireland today.

References

.

External links
Kilkenny Cats

 

1948 births
Living people
Conahy Shamrocks hurlers
Kilkenny hurling managers